Paramania LLC is a British aircraft manufacturer based in London. The company was founded by powered paraglider competition pilot Mike Campbell-Jones in Le Chillou, France in about 2002 and later relocated to the UK. It specializes in the design and manufacture of wings for powered paragliding and at one time produced paramotors for the US FAR 103 Ultralight Vehicles rules and the European microlight category.

Originally the company was established by Campbell-Jones in France to collaborate with Dudek Paragliding of Bydgoszcz, Poland in producing paragliders including Campbell-Jones' Reflex wing and paramotors, including the Paramania Vortex. Prior to that Campbell-Jones' designs were produced and marketed by the Eagle Flight Factory.

By 2015 the company was specializing only in the design and production of wings for powered paragliding and was producing the Paramania GTS, GTX, Revo and the Rokit wings.

Paramania wings are distributed by paramotor manufacturers, such as Paratour.

Aircraft

References

External links

Aircraft manufacturers of the United Kingdom
Ultralight aircraft
Paramotors